How to Pronounce Knife is a short story collection by Souvankham Thammavongsa, published in 2020 by McClelland & Stewart. The stories in the collection centre principally on the experiences of Laotian Canadian immigrant families, sometimes from the perspective of children observing the world of adults.

The book was the winner of the 2020 Giller Prize. In 2021 it was the winner of the Trillium Book Award for English prose, and a runner-up for the Danuta Gleed Literary Award.

References

2020 short story collections
Canadian short story collections
Scotiabank Giller Prize-winning works
Asian-Canadian literature
McClelland & Stewart books